Michael E. Dembrow (born c. 1951) is an American Democratic politician from the US state of Oregon, currently representing District 23 (which contains northeastern Portland, Maywood Park and Parkrose) in the Oregon Senate. Before his appointment to the Oregon Senate, Dembrow served in the Oregon House of Representatives serving District 45. Dembrow, formerly an English instructor at Portland Community College, served on Governor Ted Kulongoski's State Board of Higher Education. The Oregon League of Conservation Voters and Willamette Week endorsed Dembrow during the 2008 legislative election.

Career
According to Dembrow's official site, he is a former English instructor at Portland Community College (PCC), was President of the PCC faculty union for sixteen years, and was appointed to the State Board of Education in 2007. In 1991, Dembrow helped to create the Cascade Festival of African Films. Dembrow earned an undergraduate degree in English from the University of Connecticut and his Master's degree in Comparative Literature from Indiana University Bloomington. In 2009, Dembrow and Representative Chuck Riley (D-Hillsboro) introduced House Bill 2578, a proposal which required towers to contact property owners or tenants before towing. The bill also allowed the vehicle owner to move their vehicle "without fees beyond the initial hookup", and requires that landlords clearly display parking rules.

In 2013, following Jackie Dingfelder's resignation to serve in the office of Portland Mayor Charlie Hales, Dembrow was appointed by Multnomah County Commissioners to fill her seat in the 23rd Senate District. He was sworn in on November 20, 2013.

Personal life
Dembrow and his wife, Catherine or "Kiki" (also born ca. 1951), have one son, Nikolai C. Dembrow, and one daughter, Tatyana Janine Dembrow. Dembrow considers himself an avid runner and has completed the Portland Marathon multiple times. According to Willamette Week, Dembrow is Jewish.

See also
 76th Oregon Legislative Assembly

References

External links
 Official campaign site
 Healthcare Workforce Development (PDF)

1951 births
Living people
20th-century American Jews
Indiana University Bloomington alumni
Jews and Judaism in Portland, Oregon
Democratic Party Oregon state senators
Portland Community College faculty
University of Connecticut alumni
21st-century American politicians
21st-century American Jews